The Emperor Jones was a 1953 BBC Television production of the 1920 Eugene O'Neill play of the same title, and transmitted live on 7 July that year. It was adapted and directed by Alvin Rakoff (uncredited), starring Gordon Heath in the title role, with music by Billy Shalanki and choreography by Boscoe Holder. The production was not recorded, and is now lost. As summarised in The Radio Times, "The action of the play takes place on an island in the West Indies as yet not fully exploited by Western civilisation."

The BBC had previously broadcast an earlier production of O'Neil's play as two separate live and unrecorded performances on 11 and 13 May 1938, in which Robert Adams played Jones, and Frederick Burtwell the Trader.

Cast
 Cecil Brock as The Prison Guard
 John Harrison	as Len Griffin
 Gordon Heath as Brutus Jones
 Boscoe Holder as The Congo Witch-doctor
 Dan Jackson as Jeff
 Connie Smith as An Old Native Woman
 Harry Towb as The Auctioneer
 Neil Wilson as Henry Smithers

References

External links

1953 films
Films based on works by Eugene O'Neill
Films set in the Caribbean
British television films
Films directed by Alvin Rakoff